Dant is an unincorporated community in Marion County, Kentucky, United States. Its post office  is closed.

References

Unincorporated communities in Marion County, Kentucky
Unincorporated communities in Kentucky